Ganapatiella is a genus of parasitic alveolates of the phylum Apicomplexa.

The genus was created by Kalavati in 1977.

Taxonomy

There is one species known in this genus, Ganapatiella odontotermi.

Description

This species is found in the fat body of the termite (Odontotermes obesus).

The oocysts contain many sporocysts, each of which encloses 2 sporozoites.

Instead of the usual 1–4, eight microgametes from each microgamont during syzygy.

References

Apicomplexa genera
Monotypic SAR supergroup genera
Parasites of insects
Conoidasida